Cheri Toalson Reisch is an American politician who sits in the Missouri House of Representatives representing District 44. Reisch is a member of the Republican Party. She is the sixth-generation of her family to live in Boone County, Missouri, her ancestors having settled in the county in the 1810s.

Reisch was being sued for blocking a constituent on Twitter . In June 2018, Reisch tweeted that it was "sad to see" her 2018 election opponent, veterinarian Maren Bell Jones, put her hands behind her back during the Pledge of Allegiance at a Boone County Farm Bureau event that both candidates attended. The constituent was then blocked on Twitter after he retweeted a post by State Representative Kip Kendrick, D-Columbia, that criticized Reisch's statement.

In August 2022, Reisch falsely claimed on Facebook that students at Columbia Public Schools dressed as animals were using litterboxes as bathrooms. She reiterated the false claim two days later during an event with governor Mike Parson; when asked for evidence, she refused, claiming a need to protect "confidential sources".

Electoral History 
 Cheri Toalson Reisch has not yet had any opponents in the Republican primaries that she entered, thus getting nominated each time by default.

References

Living people
People from Boone County, Missouri
Republican Party members of the Missouri House of Representatives
21st-century American politicians
Year of birth missing (living people)
Women state legislators in Missouri
21st-century American women politicians